Oscar Larsson (born March 21, 1995) is a Swedish ice hockey player. He is currently playing with Brynäs IF of the Swedish Hockey League (SHL).

Larsson made his Swedish Hockey League debut playing with Brynäs IF during the 2014–15 SHL season. On August 26, 2015, Larsson committed to play Division 3 hockey for Northland College.

References

External links

1995 births
Living people
Brynäs IF players
Swedish ice hockey forwards